Paba is an upazila of Rajshahi District in the Division of Rajshahi, Bangladesh.

Geography
It has 40,000 households and a total area of 280.42 km2.

Paba Upazila is bounded by Mohanpur and Tanore Upazilas on the north, Puthia and Durgapur Upazila on the east, Bhagawangola II and Raninagar II CD Blocks, in Murshidabad district, West Bengal, India, across the Ganges/ Padma, and Charghat Upazila, on the south, and Godagari Upazila on the west.

Demographics
According to 2011 Bangladesh census, Paba had a population of 314,196. Males constituted 50.75% of the population and females 49.25%. Muslims formed 96.91% of the population, Hindus 1.80%, Christians 1.00% and others 0.28%. Paba had a literacy rate of 50.31% for the population 7 years and above.

According to the 1991 Bangladesh census, Paba had a population of 213,379, of whom 108,810 were aged 18 or over. Males constituted 51.7% of the population, and females 48.3%. Paba had an average literacy rate of 25.1% (7+ years), against the national average of 32.4%.

Administration
Paba Upazila is divided into Katakhali Municipality, Noahata Municipality, and eight union parishads: Baragachhi, Damkur, Darshan Para, Haragram, Harian, Haripur, Hujuri Para, and Parila. The union parishads are subdivided into 186 mauzas and 209 villages.

See also
Upazilas of Bangladesh
Districts of Bangladesh
Divisions of Bangladesh
Rajshahi Metropolitan Police

References

Upazilas of Rajshahi District